The 1992–93 Scottish First Division season was won by Raith Rovers, who were promoted along with Kilmarnock to  the Premier Division. Meadowbank Thistle and Cowdenbeath were relegated.

Table

References

Scottish First Division seasons
Scot
2